In architecture, post and lintel (also called prop and lintel or a trabeated system)  is a building system where strong horizontal elements are held up by strong vertical elements with large spaces between them. This is usually used to hold up a roof, creating a largely open space beneath, for whatever use the building is designed.  The horizontal elements are called by a variety of names including lintel, header, architrave or beam, and the supporting vertical elements may be called columns, pillars, or posts.  The use of wider elements at the top of the post, called capitals, to help spread the load, is common to many traditions.

The trabeated system is a fundamental principle of Neolithic architecture, ancient Indian architecture, ancient Greek architecture and ancient Egyptian architecture. Other trabeated styles are the Persian, Lycian, Japanese, traditional Chinese, and ancient Chinese architecture, especially in northern China, and nearly all the Indian styles. The traditions are represented in North and Central America by Mayan architecture, and in South America by Inca architecture.  In all or most of these traditions, certainly in Greece and India, the earliest versions developed using wood, which were later translated into stone for larger and grander buildings. Timber framing, also using trusses, remains common for smaller buildings such as houses to the modern day.

The biggest disadvantage to a post and lintel construction is the limited weight that can be held up, and the small distances required between the posts. Ancient Roman architecture's development of the arch allowed for much larger structures to be constructed. The arcuated system spreads larger loads more effectively, and replaced the post and lintel trabeated system in most larger buildings and structures, until the introduction of steel girder beams in the industrial era.  As with the Roman temple portico front and its descendants in later classical architecture, trabeated features were often retained in parts of buildings as an aesthetic choice.  The classical orders of Greek origin were in particular retained in buildings designed to impress, even though they usually had little or no structural role.

Lintel beams

In architecture, a post-and-lintel or trabeated system refers to the use of horizontal beams or lintels which are borne up by columns or posts.  The name is from the Latin trabs, beam; influenced by trabeatus, clothed in the trabea, a ritual garment.

A noteworthy example of a trabeated system is in Volubilis, from the Roman era, where one side of the Decumanus Maximus is lined with trabeated elements, while the opposite side of the roadway is designed in arched style.

In India the style was used originally for wooden construction, but later the technique was adopted for stone structures for decorated load-bearing and purely ornamented non-structural purposes.

Engineering
Post and lintel construction is one of four ancient structural methods of building, the others being the corbel, arch-and-vault, and truss.

There are two main force vectors acting upon the post and lintel system: weight carrying compression at the joint between lintel and post, and tension induced by deformation of self-weight and the load above between the posts. The two posts are under compression from the weight of the lintel (or beam) above. The lintel will deform by sagging in the middle because the underside is under tension and the topside is under compression.

See also

 Architrave – structural lintel or beam resting on columns-pillars
 Atalburu – Basque decorative lintel
 Dolmen – Neolithic megalithic tombs with structural stone lintels
 Dougong – traditional Chinese structural element
 I-beam – steel lintels and beams
 Marriage stone – decorative lintel
 Opus caementicium
 Structural design
 Timber framing – post and beam systems
 Stonehenge

Notes

References
Summerson, John, The Classical Language of Architecture, 1980 edition, Thames and Hudson World of Art series, 

Architectural elements
Ancient Roman architectural elements
Building
Building engineering
Doors
Windows
Timber framing
Structural system